The Postal Officers' Union (PVL) was a trade union representing postal service workers in Finland.

The union was founded in 1894 in Helsinki, as the Finnish Postal Union. It did not represent all workers in the postal service, but only officers whose jobs required them to undertake specific training and demonstrate their language skills; other workers joined the Postal Union.

For many years, the union was affiliated to the Finnish Confederation of Professionals (STTK). By 2000, the distinction between officers and other workers no longer existed, and the union began collaborating more closely with the Postal Union. In order to facilitate a merger, in 2003 it resigned from the STTK and joined the Central Organisation of Finnish Trade Unions. By this point, the union had around 5,000 members.

In 2005, the union merged with the Postal Union, to form the Post and Logistics Union.

References

Postal trade unions
Trade unions in Finland
Trade unions established in 1894
Trade unions disestablished in 2005